Mobarakabad (also Romanized as Mobārakābād) is a city in the Central District of Malekan County, East Azerbaijan province, Iran. At the 2006 census, its population was 3,661 in 889 households, when it was a village. The following census in 2011 counted 4,198 people in 1,178 households. The latest census in 2016 showed a population of 4,456 people in 1,317 households, by which time the village was raised to the status of a city, listed in the census as Mobarak Shahr.

References 

Malekan County

Cities in East Azerbaijan Province

Populated places in East Azerbaijan Province

Populated places in Malekan County